Siege of Lyakhavichy (Lachowicze) took place from 23 March to 28 June 1660 during the Russo-Polish War (1654–67). Lachowicze was one of the major Grand Duchy of Lithuania strongholds in the disputed region (modern Belarus). A Russian army of about 30,000 under Ivan Nikitich Khovansky laid siege to the castle, defended by Mikołaj Judycki. After four failed sieges, Khovansky was forced to face a Polish relief army under hetmans Stefan Czarniecki and Paweł Jan Sapieha, and was defeated at the Battle of Polonka. This meant the end of the siege of Lachowicze.

Lachowicze was the only fortress of the Grand Duchy of Lithuania that evaded capture by Russians during that war. Due to a legend that it was protected by the Mary, mother of Jesus it was compared to Jasna Góra (which recently withstood a similar siege).

Lyakhavichy
Conflicts in 1660
1660 in Europe
Lyakhavichy
Lyakhavichy
Lyakhavichy